Peter Campbell Blaicher (August 1, 1835 – March 20, 1900) was mayor of Hamilton, Ontario from 1892 to 1893.

References
 Hamilton Public Library biography

1835 births
1900 deaths
Mayors of Hamilton, Ontario